Huade (Mongolian:   Quvadė siyan) is a county of central Inner Mongolia, People's Republic of China, bordering Hebei province to the southeast, Xilin Gol League to the northeast, and Shangdu County to the west. It is under the administration of Ulaan Chab city.

Climate
Huade has a monsoon-influenced, continental semi-arid climate (Köppen BSk), with very cold and dry winters, hot, somewhat humid summers, and strong winds, especially in spring. With monthly percent possible sunshine ranging from 60% in July to 75% in January and October, sunshine is abundant year-round, and there are 3,077 hours of bright sunshine annually.

References
www.xzqh.org

External links

County-level divisions of Inner Mongolia
Ulanqab